The Academia de Marinha (Portuguese for "Navy Academy" or "Marine Academy"), MembIH is the cultural agency of the Portuguese Navy under the Chief of Naval Staff. Its purpose is to promote and to publish artistic, literary, historical, and scientific studies relating to the sea and maritime activities. Its offices are located in Lisbon at the Naval Headquarters, Rua do Arsenal.

History
This agency of the Portuguese Navy developed from the Maritime History Studies group (Grupo de Estudos de História Marítima), established in 1969 by the vice-admirals Sarmento Rodrigues and Teixeira da Mota. In the following year, it was renamed the Center for Naval Studies (Centro de Estudos de Marinha). In December 1978, its role was widened into a broader cultural agency and renamed the Academia de Marinha (Portaria nº 769).

Motto
The motto of the Academia de Marinha is a verse from Os Lusíadas:

Por mares nunca de outro lenho arados (Portuguese for: "On seas never plowed by other wood")

Membership
Members of the Academy are admitted to one of four categories:
 Emeritus members
 Active members
 Corresponding members
 Associate members

The first three categories must be Portuguese citizens or citizens of Portuguese-speaking countries, while the last is reserved for foreign members.

Each category of membership is made up of two classes:

 Class of Maritime History
 Class of Arts, Letters, and Sciences

Portuguese Navy
Recipients of the Order of Prince Henry
Military of Portugal
Military installations in Portugal